Phlegra fasciata is a species of jumping spiders that can be found in Palearctic region.

References

 Phlegra fasciata at the World Spider Catalog

Salticidae
Spiders described in 1826
Spiders of Europe
Palearctic spiders